The Pacific Western Athletic Association is a Canadian college athletic conference affiliated in the Canadian Collegiate Athletic Association (CCAA).

The Commissioner of the PWAA is Scott Foot, esq.

Members
 Camosun College Chargers (Victoria)
 Capilano University Blues (North Vancouver)
 College of the Rockies Avalanche (Cranbrook)
 Columbia Bible College Bearcats (Abbotsford)
 Douglas College Royals (New Westminster)
 Langara College Falcons (Vancouver)
 Okanagan College Coyotes (Kelowna)
 Vancouver Island University Mariners (Nanaimo)

See also
Canadian Collegiate Athletic Association

External links
 Pacific Western Athletic Association
 Canadian Collegiate Athletic Association

Sports governing bodies in British Columbia
University and college sports in Canada
College athletics conferences in Canada
1970 establishments in British Columbia
Student sports governing bodies